The 2008 Targa Tasmania was the seventeenth running of the five-day Tarmac Rally event.  It was held between 15 April 2008 and 20 April 2008 on 38 competitive closed road stages in the state of Tasmania, Australia. It was contested by over 300 competitors breaking the previous record field for the five-day format of 291 in 2002 and 2004.

Stages

Results

Modern Competition

Classic Competition

Rookie Rallye Modern Competition

Rookie Rallye Classic Competition

Controversy

Targa racers just 'hoons and bandits'

Angry Hobart aldermen branded Targa Tasmania as "organised hooning" and its competitors "environmental bandits". Eva Ruzicka and Bill Harvey came out firing in their decision not to approve a proposed Targa stage on the Domain in April. Targa boss Mark Perry said if the Domain stage did not go ahead, there would be no plans for a 2009 stage. The council refused to agree on a night stage in 2007 and the Domain stage was axed.

Skelta robbed of Targa podium

Vandersee/Kelley were penalised for stopping to offer assistance to the crew of a crashed car near lunchtime on day four. This penalty ultimately cost the Skelta team its first podium in the Targa Tasmania tarmac event. The seven second penalty ultimately pushed the hard charging team to a four-second deficit behind the Subaru crew of Dean Herridge and Glenn McNeal.

References

External links

Road rallying
Motorsport in Tasmania
Rally competitions in Australia
Targa Tasmania
Targa